Woodrising may refer to:

 Woodrising, New South Wales, a suburb of the City of Lake Macquarie in New South Wales, Australia
 Woodrising, Norfolk, a parish in the Mitford district, Norfolk, England